Something Different is a 1967 comedy play by Carl Reiner. Reiner directed the original production which starred Bob Dishy.

The play was profiled in the William Goldman book The Season: A Candid Look at Broadway.

References

External links
 (archive)
 

1967 plays
Works by Carl Reiner